The Federal Capital Territory (FCT), is a federal territory in central Nigeria. Abuja, the capital city of Nigeria, is located in this territory. The FCT was formed in 1976 from parts of the states of old Kaduna, Kwara, Niger, and Plateau states, with the bulk of land mass carved out of Niger state. The Federal Capital Territory is within the North Central region of the country. Unlike other states of Nigeria, which are headed by elected Governors, it is administered by the Federal Capital Territory Administration, headed by a minister, who is appointed by the President.

History 
The Federal Capital Territory was created upon the promulgation of decree number 6 of 1976. It came into existence due to a need to find a replacement for the capital city of Lagos, which had become congested and had little space for expansion. The area chosen as the new capital was principally Gwari Land (the home of the tribes referred to as the Gbagyis, their language is referred to as Gwari) with high concentrations of Muslims and Christians and high degree of neutrality from the dominant ethnic groups. It is the least populated state in Nigeria.

Decree 6 of 1976, gave the federal government rights over land within the territory. The population density prior to the takeover by the government was sparse with a population of 120,000 residents living in 840 villages and mostly of Gwari heritage. Inhabitants were relocated to nearby towns like Suleja in Niger state, and New Karshi in Nasarawa State on the outskirts of the territory. Today, this is more than 2 million residents in the territories of the FCT.

Geography

The territory is located just north of the confluence of the Niger River and Benue River. It is bordered by the states of Niger to the West and North, Kaduna to the northeast, Nasarawa to the east and south, and Kogi to the southwest.

Lying between latitudes 8.25 and 9.20 north of the equator and longitudes 6.45 and 7.39 east of Greenwich Meridian, The Federal Capital Territory is geographically located at the center of the country.

The Federal Capital Territory has a landmass of approximately 7,315 km2, and it is situated within the savannah region with moderate climatic conditions.

Natural resources
Minerals found in the FCT include marble, tin, clay, mica, and tantalite.

Wildlife
The hills of the FCT provide home to many bushbuck, forest Black duiker, bush pig, chimpanzee and red-flanked duiker.
Also found in FCT woodland are leopard, buffalo, roan antelope, Western hartebeest, elephant, warthog, grey duiker, dog-faced baboon, patas monkey and green monkey.

Climate 
Like some northern states in Nigeria, the Federal Capital Territory is relatively mild. The Federal Capital Territory is usually very hot between the months of January and April. The average daily maximum temperature of the city is above , with the month of March being the hottest month. The rainy season in the territory lasts between July and October of every year but the coolest month is December, during the harmattan season. During the harmattan, there is high relative humidity, coupled with windy and foggy atmosphere.

Subdivisions

While the Federal Capital Territory minister administers the whole of the Federal Capital Territory, the Federal Capital Development Authority (FCDA) specifically manages the construction and infrastructure development of the region.

The territory is currently made up of six local government areas, namely:

 Abaji
 Abuja Municipal
 Bwari
 Gwagwalada
 Kuje
 Kwali

Languages
Languages of the Federal Capital Territory listed by local government area (LGA) are presented in tabular format as follows:

Hausa language is widely spoken at the Federal Capital Territory.

Politics 
The council was elected in the 2022 Federal Capital Territory local elections.

References

External links

Government of the Federal Capital Territory

 
Federal Capital Territory
Capital districts and territories
States and territories established in 1976